Fede Álvarez (born July 31, 1974 in Mexico City) is a Mexican association football manager. He graduated with honors in 2010 from the National Coaching School, run by the Mexican Football Federation.

Coaching career
He is known for his coaching work done in Santos Laguna youth development as head coach of U17 and U20 teams.  During his coaching time at Santos Laguna, the team was successful at tournaments in Italy, Sweden, and in his hometown in Mexico. While studying to become a pro license coach, he has become the only student ever to be invited to a FIFA Futuro III Course for Coaches Instructors, sharing his knowledge and ideas with already successful coaches from the national and international scene. In 2011, he gave an Innovation Course for future Pro Coaches as part of the National Coaching School program of the Mexican Football Federation in Mexico city. Between 2012 and 2014 he worked for Santos Laguna, first as an Assistant Coach - U20's for one season, and then as Head Coach - U17's for three seasons.

References

External links
 Fede Álvarez CV Wayback Machine
 Fede Álvarez Website 

1974 births
Living people
Mexican football managers
Sportspeople from Mexico City